Murdin is a surname. Notable people with the surname include:

 John Murdin (1891–1971), English cricketer
 Paul Murdin (born 1942), British astronomer

See also
 Mudin
 Murin (surname)